Sumit Panda (born 3 December 1979) is an Indian former cricketer. He played first-class cricket for Bengal and Jharkhand.

See also
 List of Bengal cricketers

References

External links
 

1979 births
Living people
Indian cricketers
Bengal cricketers
Jharkhand cricketers
People from Jamshedpur
Cricketers from Jharkhand